I Love, I Kill is a 1968 thriller novel by the British writer John Bingham. Dodd Mead released it in America with the alternative title Good Old Charlie.

References

Bibliography
 Reilly, John M. Twentieth Century Crime & Mystery Writers. Springer, 2015.
 West, Nigel. The A to Z of British Intelligence. Scarecrow Press, 2009.

1968 British novels
British thriller novels
Novels by John Bingham
Victor Gollancz Ltd books